British Study Centres (BSC) is a group of English language schools consisting of eight adult language schools and seventeen junior centres, including the City Football Language School in partnership with Manchester City, with the majority of schools and centres based in the UK. The head office is located in Brighton & Hove, East Sussex. Today, British Study Centres (BSC) specialises in English language training for adults and young learners, teacher training courses for UK and overseas teachers and University Pathway programmes in partnership with NCUK.

History and location
British Study Centres has its roots in distance learning courses from the 1930s onwards (a precursor to the Open University which grew up in the 1960s), branching off from its sister company West London College which offers further and higher education courses in 1996. The first school was opened in Oxford, and after a location move in 2008, it occupiesd the four-floor building of Oxenford House in the centre of the town. In 2002 the second college was opened in Brighton, and in 2004 a third school opened in Marylebone, central London. A fourth school opened in Bournemouth in May 2010 as well as a specialist teacher training facility in central Oxford which opened later that year. The college's head office moved from Hannah House to Duke Street, opposite Selfridges and adjoining Oxford Street, in early 2010. These schools have now closed down.

In 2008, the company moved into the young learners market with the acquisition of 'ICH' (International College Holidays), a provider of vacation courses to children. Since acquiring ICH, British Study Centres has offered junior courses at independent schools in Ardingly, Cheltenham and Wycliffe. The company has added a fourth UK centre in Brockenhurst, in 2013.

Across its adult schools and junior centres there is an annual intake of 7500 students consisting of approximately 80 nationalities.

Membership
British Study Centres is a member of English UK.

The adult schools hold a UKBA “Grade A” Tier 4 Sponsor's Licence.

Courses
The schools offer full-time courses in the following subjects for adults: general English, academic English, business English and exam preparation for IELTS, TOEIC / TOEFL, BULATS and Cambridge FCE and CAE. The adult courses are offered in Bournemouth, Brighton, London and Oxford.

Teacher training qualifications offered include the Cambridge Certificate in General English Teaching to Adults (CELTA), Cambridge Diploma in General English Teaching to Adults (DELTA), and Trinity College Certificate in Teaching English to Speakers of Other Languages (CertTESOL). Teacher training takes place in Brighton and Oxford.

Junior courses are offered in general English and English plus sports at four junior vacation centres in Ardingly, Bournemouth the University of Brighton, Oxford Brookes University and Wycliffe

In 2013, British Study Centres became one of the first UK-based EFL language schools to start offering online courses through video-conferencing.  They use the same teachers from their UK schools to deliver General English, Business English and Exam Preparation courses to students around the world who are unable to travel to the UK to study.

Charity affiliation 

British Study Centres’ chosen charity is the Hot Courses Foundation.  part of the Hot Courses Group, Set up in 2004, the charity helps fund the education of HIV+ children in the developing world whose access to education is limited or non-existent. BSC's chairman, Simon Cleaver is trustee for the charity as well as Jeremy Hunt MP, Baroness Morris of Yardley (former Secretary of State for Education), Mike and Sarah Elms, Alex Williams and Simon Philips. The Foundation initially focused on AIDS-orphans in Kenya, providing money to fund their education and provide school uniforms and related resources. The Hot Courses Foundation then built a primary school in Kitui, eastern Kenya, which came top in recent assessments of schools in the area.

References

Further education colleges in London